United Left of the Balearic Islands (EUIB) is the Balearic federation of the Spanish left wing political and social movement United Left. Juan José Martínez Riera is the current General Coordinator. The Communist Party of the Balearic Islands (PCIB-PCE, Balearic federation of PCE) is the major member of the coalition.

Organization
EUIB has a structure distributed by islands, although the "island groups" don't have a separate legal personality. The most important are those of Majorca (United Left of Majorca) and Menorca (Left of Menorca).

See also
Communist Party of the Balearic Islands

References

External links
Official page

Balearic Islands
Political parties in the Balearic Islands